Hank Griffin (ca. 1870 – 2 May 1911) was an African American boxer who fought some of the greatest fighters in history, including World Colored Middleweight Champion Harris "The Black Pearl" Martin, World Colored Heavyweight Champion Frank Childs and World Heavyweight Champions Jack Johnson and James J. Jeffries.

In 1896, in a very early match in James J. Jeffries career, Griffin was lost via a KO. In 1901, Griffin fought Jeffries again which resulted in a no-decision. In 1902, Griffin fought Jack Johnson twice in Los Angeles, California. Griffin fought well but lost both bouts. In Jack Johnson's 1927 autobiography, Johnson stated that:

"In summing up my fights, throughout my career, there were none, even in the championship bouts, which were harder than those with Griffen (sic), and I believe that the greatest punishment I ever received in the ring was at the hands of Griffen."

References

External links

African-American boxers
World colored heavyweight boxing champions
1870 births
1911 deaths
American male boxers
Place of birth missing
20th-century African-American people